Kanabiso Pokuna Raja Maha Vihara  is an ancient Buddhist temple in Monaragala District, Sri Lanka. The temple is located in Handapanagala village approximately  distance from Wellawaya town. The temple has been formally recognised by the Government as an archaeological site in Sri Lanka. The designation was declared on 22 November 2002 under the government Gazette number 1264.

The temple
It is believed that this temple was constructed by King Dutugamunu (161 BC – 137 BC). Among the archaeological remains a ruined Stupa, scattered stone columns, and two dripledged caves are identified. The Stupa is almost in the dilapidated state, resembling a large mound of earth.

References

Buddhist temples in Monaragala District
Archaeological protected monuments in Monaragala District